Mohsen Gheytaslou (1990 - April 11, 2016) was an Iranian Takavar and the first member of the 65th Airborne Special Forces Brigade to be killed in the Syrian Civil War. He was deployed to Syria in an advisory capacity and to protect holy shrines in the Syria. Ghitaslou was killed on 11 April 2016 in Syria.

References

External links 
 Mohsen Ghitaslou photo

Iranian Takavars
People from Tehran Province
1990 births
2016 deaths
Iranian military personnel killed in action
Military personnel killed in the Syrian civil war